The following is an incomplete list of annual festivals and cultural events in Calgary and the Calgary Region, in the province of Alberta, Canada.

This list includes festivals of diverse types, such as regional festivals, commerce festivals, fairs, food festivals, arts festivals, religious festivals, folk festivals, and recurring festivals on holidays.

List of festivals in Calgary

Most attended festivals

Calgary Stampede

The city of Calgary is famous for the Calgary Stampede, a large agricultural fair and rodeo held every July. The Stampede officially bills itself as "The Greatest Outdoor Show on Earth". It features an internationally recognized rodeo competition, a midway, stage shows, agricultural competitions, chuckwagon races, First Nations exhibitions, and pancake breakfasts around the city. It is among the largest and most well known festivals in Canada. The event has a  year history. In 2005, attendance at the 10-day rodeo and exhibition totaled 1,242,928, which set a new record. Attendance at the Stampede Parade (North America's second longest parade), which takes place downtown on opening day, is usually somewhere between 300,000 and 400,000.  During Stampede Week, many of the city's residents dress in country attire, and many businesses decorate their stores and offices in western style.

Lilac Festival

The Lilac Festival is an annual street festival held in Calgary, Alberta. In 2005 it had an estimated 120,000 attendance. The festival takes place along the 13 blocks of 4th Street (between 13th Avenue South and Elbow Drive) in the Beltline and Mission neighborhoods.

Sun and Salsa Festival

The Sun and Salsa Festival is an annual festival put on in the Kensington Business Revitalization Zone (BRZ) of Calgary. Attendance of the festival has grown to around 100,000 in 2010.

Former festivals 
This is a list of festivals that no longer exist, have been on a prolonged hiatus, or festivals that were once held in Calgary but have since moved to elsewhere.

 Bow River Flow (August) — human-powered transportation festival
 Calgary Corn Festival - Kingsland Farmers' Market (August)
 Calgary Intercultural Turkish Festival (July)
 FozzyFest (Canada Day long weekend) — outdoor electronic music festival in South Kananaskis
 Haultain and First Street Festival in Victoria Park (September)
 Morningside Music Bridge (July) — international music festival, originally hosted by Mount Royal University in Calgary but now held in Boston
 Summerstock (August)
 Sun and Salsa Festival (July) — Latin festival in Kensington. In 2015, organizers announced that the festival would be cancelled due to construction developments in the community, and has been under an indefinite hiatus since.
 X-Fest Calgary (August) — Alternative music festival in Fort Calgary.

See also

List of festivals in Alberta 
List of festivals in Canada 
Lists of festivals by city
Culture of Calgary
List of attractions and landmarks in Calgary

References

External links

&
Festivals
Calgary